Kish gas Field is a giant gas field close to Kish Island in the Persian Gulf.

The field also holds at least  of condensate of which at least  are recoverable.

The field gas is sweet, it contains 50-80 PPM hydrogen sulphide.
The field has the potential of producing 4000 million cubic meters of natural gas per day.

In February 2010, an Iranian consortium headed by Bank Mellat signed a $10-billion agreement with the National Iranian Oil Company (NIOC) to develop the Kish gas field. The gas field will produce 85 million cubic meters of natural gas per day

See also

World Largest Gas Fields
NIOC Recent Discoveries
Iran Natural Gas Reserves
North Pars
South Pars Gas Field
Golshan Gas Field
Ferdowsi Gas Field
Persian LNG

References

Natural gas fields in Iran
Kish Island
Geography of Hormozgan Province